T. P. Senkumar (born 10 June 1957) is an Indian lawyer and retired police officer in the Indian Police Service. He served as the State Police Chief of Kerala.

He was appointed the State Police Chief on 31 May 2015, replacing K. S. Balasubramaniam IPS, who retired on 31 May 2015. The request of Mahesh Kumar Singla IPS, who then later served as the DGP, Border Security Force, to be considered for the position, was turned down by the Cabinet. Senkumar had more than 2 years left before retirement, which was considered while making the appointment.
He was replaced by Lokanath Behera IPS, and transferred as head of the Police Housing Construction Corporation on 31 May 2016, by the then newly-elected LDF government.

On 24 April 2017, the Supreme Court of India ordered reinstatement of Senkumar as the State Police Chief. The government had to reappoint Senkumar as the State Police Chief again on 5 May 2017 .

Education
Senkumar completed his college education from Christ College, Irinjalakuda.  He holds a Postgraduate degree in Economics, and a degree in Law. Senkumar has submitted a thesis on road accidents to the University of Kerala, which was completed under the guidance of noted economist and Chairman of the State Finance Commission, M. A. Oommen.

Career
Dr.T.P.Senkumar was born in Trichur district of Kerala.  In 1980, completed Post Graduate in Economics from Dr.John Mathai Center, Calicut University, Department of Economics.  In 1981 was enlisted to Indian Economic Service and joined Indian Economic Service.  In 1983, was selected to Indian Police Service and joined Indian Police Service, Kerala cadre.  After training, posted as ASP Thalasserry and Kannur.  Promoted as SP and posted as Commandant of APTC and KAP I & III.

Posts Held: 

1988 to 1991       -    Supdt. of Police, Alappuzha & Kollam                

1991 to 1995       -    Served as ADC to Governor.  

1995 to 1996       -    Commissioner of Police, Kochi City.  

1996 to 2000       -    DIG Crime Branch CID.  

2000 to 2001       -    Vigilance officer, Excise Department.  

2001 to 2004       -    MD, KSBC & Addl. Excise Commissioner

2004 to 2005       -    IG Vigilance & Director & MD KSBC

2005 to 2006       -    IGP South Zone

2006               -    Chief Investigating Officer, State Human Rights Commission

2006 to 2010       -    Chairman & MD, Kerala State Road Transport Corporation 

2009 to 2011       -    MD, KTDFC (Addl. charge)

2010 to 2012       -    Transport Commissioner, Govt. of Kerala

2012 to 2013       -    Addl. DGP (Intelligence), Kerala

2014 to 2015       -    Director General of Prisons & Correctional Services, Kerala

2015 to 2016       -    DGP & State Police Chief, Kerala

01/06/2016         -    Removed from the post of DGP & State Police Chief of Kerala and downgraded to a lower post ie; KPHCC MD.  
                        Went on HPL and fought against the illegal order of the state government. 
01/02/2017         -    Director General, IMG, Kerala

April/2017         -     Hon'ble Supreme Court of India, pronounced a judgment 
                         (Civil Appeal No.5227 of 2017 (Dr.T.P.Senkumar Vs Union of India & Others [2017(2) KLT 453]) to re-instate as 
                         DGP & State Police Chief, Kerala 

06/05/2017 to 30/06/2017  DGP & State Police Chief, Kerala

30/06/2017          -           Retired from Service. 

Got LLB degree from Kerala University and Ph.D from Kerala University on the thesis entitled '''“ROAD ACCIDENTS IN “KERALA – A SOCIO-ECONOMIC STUDY”."

Awards / Rewards

v   2002 – President's Police Medal for Meritorious Service

v   2009 – President's Police Medal for Distinguished Service

v  Received Meritorious Service Award from Govt. of Kerala for handling Perumon train accident with most effective way in 1988. 

v  Appreciation Letters for Investigation of important cases and Law &order situations.   

v  Published a service story named "Ente Police Jeevitham" (DC Books Publications) April/2019.

Medals and recognition
In 2009, Senkumar was awarded the President's Medal for Distinguished Service.

References

External links
 

1957 births
Living people
Indian police officers
People from Thrissur
20th-century Indian economists
20th-century Indian lawyers
People from Irinjalakuda
Scientists from Kerala
Civil Servants from Kerala